Anguillara Sabazia is a town and comune in the Metropolitan City of Rome, Lazio, central Italy, around  northwest of Rome. It nestles on a small cape on the coast of Lake Bracciano; its medieval center and its beach make it a popular destination for tourists.

Anguillara is served by a local train (line "FR3", or Rome-Capranica-Viterbo Railroad) which connects it with Rome (stations of Roma Ostiense and of Valle Aurelia) in around 40 minutes.

The two lakes and the surrounding area have been declared a Regional Park and are under a strict naturalistic control.

A two-part episode of the American sitcom Everybody Loves Raymond was shot in the town.

On October 4–5, 2020, Anguillara Sabazia held a run-off election for mayor between center-right candidate Angelo Pizzigallo and center-left candidate Michele Cardone. Pizzigallo won by a slim 43-vote margin (according to the city's website, the final ballot count was 4,026 to 3,983), with only 8,281 of the 19,000 residents voting.

References

External links

 

Cities and towns in Lazio